Kotikalapudi (also spelled as Kotikelapudi) is a given name. Notable people with the given name include:

 Kotikalapudi Seethamma (1874–1936), Indian writer and social reformer
 Kotikalapudi Venkata Krishna Rao (1923–2016), better known as K. V. Krishna Rao, former Chief of the Indian Army

Surnames of Indian origin